Gaslight is the artificial light produced by burning gas.

Gaslight may also refer to:
 Gas Light, a 1938 play by Patrick Hamilton
 Gaslight (1940 film), starring Diana Wynyard, Anton Walbrook, and Frank Pettingell
 Gaslight (1944 film), directed by George Cukor, starring Ingrid Bergman, Charles Boyer and Angela Lansbury
 Gaslight (1958 film), starring Beverley Dunne
 Gaslighting, manipulating someone to make them question their reality
 Gaslight (automobile), a defunct American automobile company (1960 – c. 1961)
 Gaslight Tavern, a club in Lawrence, Kansas
 The Gaslight Cafe, a club in Greenwich Village in New York
 "Gaslight", a single by Willow from the album Lately I Feel Everything

See also
Gaslamp (disambiguation)
Gaslighter (disambiguation)
Gaslit (disambiguation)
Gas lighter
Gas Light and Coke Company